Annie Elizabeth "Bessie" Delany (3 September 1891 – 25 September 1995) was an American civil rights pioneer who was the subject, along with her elder sister Sarah "Sadie" Delany, of The New York Times bestselling oral history, Having Our Say: The Delany Sisters' First 100 Years, written by journalist Amy Hill Hearth. Delany had earned a Doctor of Dental Surgery (DDS) degree from Columbia University in 1923, and was the second black woman licensed to practice dentistry in New York State. With the publication of the book, she became famous at the age of 101.

Biography
Delany was the third of ten children born to the Rt. Rev. Henry Beard Delany (1858–1928), the first black person elected Bishop of the Episcopal Church in the United States, and Nanny (Logan) Delany (1861–1956), an educator. H.B. Delany was born into slavery in St. Mary's, Georgia. Nanny Logan was born in a community then known as Yak, Virginia, seven miles from Danville.

Bessie Delany was born and raised on the campus of St. Augustine's School (now University) in Raleigh, North Carolina, where her father was the Vice-Principal and her mother, a teacher and administrator. Delany was a 1911 graduate of the school. In 1918, she followed her sister to New York City. She enrolled at Columbia University, from which she earned her dental degree in 1923. Of 170 students in her graduating class, she was the only black female. She shared a dental office with her brother, Dr. H. B. Delany Jr., at 2305 Seventh Avenue, and later, 2303 Seventh Avenue, in Harlem.  Throughout her life, Bessie Delany participated in many protests and marches, and encouraged civil rights organizers to meet at her and her brother's office.

Death
Delany died at the age of 104 in Mount Vernon, New York, where she had long resided. She is interred at Mount Hope Cemetery in Raleigh, North Carolina.

The Delany Sisters

In 1991, Delany and her sister Sadie were interviewed by journalist Amy Hill Hearth, who wrote a feature story about them for The New York Times ("Two 'Maiden Ladies' With Century-Old Stories to Tell".) A New York book publisher read Hearth's newspaper story and asked her to write a full-length book on the sisters. Hearth and the sisters worked closely for two years to create the book, Having our Say: The Delany Sisters' First 100 Years, which dealt with the trials and tribulations the sisters had faced during their century of life. The book was on The New York Times bestseller lists for 105 weeks. It was developed into a Broadway play written and directed by Emily Mann in 1995 and a television film in 1999. Both the play and film adaptations were produced by Judith R. James and Dr. Camille O. Cosby. 

In 1994, the sisters and Hearth published The Delany Sisters' Book of Everyday Wisdom, a follow up to Having Our Say. After Bessie's death, Sadie Delany and Hearth created a third book, On my Own at 107; Reflections on Life Without Bessie. 

Her siblings were:
 Lemuel Thackara Delany (1887–1956)
 Sarah Louise ("Sadie") Delany (1889–1999)
 Julia Emery Delany (1893–1974)
 Henry Delany, Jr. (1895–1991)
 Lucius Delany (1897–1969)
 William Manross Delany (1899–1955)
 Hubert Thomas Delany (1901–1990)
 Laura Edith Delany (1903–1993)
 Samuel Ray Delany (1906–1960)

Living Relative Families: Delany, Mickey, Stent, and Graham Families

Bibliography

Further reading

References

External links

 Amy Hill Hearth, co-author of Having Our Say
 
 
 
 

1891 births
1995 deaths
American centenarians
American dentists
African-American dentists
Women dentists
American Episcopalians
Columbia University College of Dental Medicine alumni
African-American Episcopalians
Episcopalian families
St. Augustine's University (North Carolina) alumni
Delany family
African-American centenarians
Women centenarians
20th-century dentists